The first season of Criminal Minds premiered on CBS on September 22, 2005, and ended May 10, 2006.

Cast

Main 
 Mandy Patinkin as Supervisory Special Agent Jason Gideon (BAU Senior Agent)
 Thomas Gibson as Supervisory Special Agent Aaron "Hotch" Hotchner (BAU Unit Chief)
 Lola Glaudini as Supervisory Special Agent Elle Greenaway (BAU Agent)
 Shemar Moore as Supervisory Special Agent Derek Morgan (BAU Agent)
 Matthew Gray Gubler as Supervisory Special Agent Dr. Spencer Reid (BAU Agent)
 A. J. Cook as Supervisory Special Agent Jennifer "JJ" Jareau (BAU Communications Liaison) Cook joined the main cast after the pilot episode. Her first appearance was in the second episode "Compulsion."

Also starring 
 Kirsten Vangsness as Special Agent Penelope Garcia (BAU Technical Analyst)

Recurring 
 Meredith Monroe as Haley Hotchner
 Jane Lynch as Diana Reid

Guest stars 

 

In the pilot episode, "Extreme Aggressor", Andrew Jackson guest-starred as Timothy Vogel. Chelah Horsdal guest-starred as his victim, Heather Woodland. In the episode "Won't Get Fooled Again", Tim Kelleher guest-starred as Adrian Bale, a serial bomber responsible for the deaths of six FBI agents. In the episode "Plain Sight", Kirk B. R. Woller guest-starred as serial rapist Franklin Graney. In the episode "Broken Mirror", Matt Letscher guest-starred as Vincent Shyer, an erotomaniacal stalker who abducts one of the twin daughters of Executive Assistant District Attorney Evan Davenport, played by Robin Thomas. Elisabeth Harnois guest-starred in a dual role as Davenport's daughters, Patricia and Cheryl.

 

In the episode "L.D.S.K.", Marcus Giamatti guest-starred as Barry Landman, a narcissistic trauma surgeon suspected of committing several shootings. Paula Newsome portrays Detective Shea Calvin, who leads the investigation of the shootings. In the episode "The Fox", Neal Jones guest-starred as one of the series' most notorious criminals, Karl Arnold, aka "The Fox", a serial killer who murders entire families. Tony Todd guest-starred as Eric Miller, a man who was wrongfully imprisoned for the murder of his family. In the episode "Natural Born Killer", Patrick Kilpatrick guest-starred as Vincent Perotta, a professional hitman who abducts FBI agent Josh Cramer of the Organized Crime Unit. Francesco Quinn guest-starred as Michael Russo, a mob boss who hires Perotta to abduct Cramer. 

 

In the episode "Derailed", Chris Bauer guest-starred as Dr. Theodore Bryar, who has paranoid schizophrenia and held several passengers hostage, including Elle Greenaway, on a train. Jeff Kober guest-starred as Bryar's imaginary friend, Leo, and M. C. Gainey guest-starred as Detective Frank Moretti, who leads the investigation of the hostage situation. In the episode "The Popular Kids", Will Rothhaar guest-starred as Cory Bridges, a cult killer who murdered two high school students. In the episode "Blood Hungry", Kris Lemche guest-starred as cannibalistic spree killer, Eddie Mays, and Lindsay Crouse played his mother, Mary. In the episode "What Fresh Hell?", Ned Vaughn guest-starred as Donald Curtis, a pedophile who abducts an eleven-year-old girl named Belinda Copeland. 

 

In the episode "Poison", Nick Jameson guest-starred as Edward Hill, a serial killer who murders people with poisonous drugs. In the episode "Riding the Lightning", Jeannetta Arnette guest-starred as Sarah Jean Dawes, an inmate on death row who is determined to make sure her son never finds out the truth of his parentage. Michael Massee guest-starred as Jacob Dawes, her husband and a serial killer who murdered several teenage girls. In the episode "Unfinished Business", Aaron Lustig guest-starred as Walter Kern, aka "The Keystone Killer", and Geoff Pierson guest-starred as Max Ryan, a retired FBI Agent who is determined to find the killer. 
 
In the episode "The Tribe", Chad Allen guest-starred as Jackson Cally, a cult leader who tortures and murders college students. In the episode "A Real Rain", Ethan Phillips guest-starred as schizophrenic vigilante killer Marvin Doyle. David Aaron Baker played Will Sykes, an attempted copycat of Doyle who wanted to be famous, and Tonya Pinkins played Detective Nora Bennett, who leads the investigation of the killings. In the episode "Somebody's Watching", Katheryn Winnick guest-starred as Maggie Lowe, a serial killer and stalker who obsesses over actress Lila Archer. Ian Anthony Dale guest-starred as Detective Owen Kim, who leads the investigation of the murders. 

In the episode "Charm and Harm", Andy Comeau guest-starred as Mark Gregory, a serial killer and abductor who murders his victims by drowning them. In the episode, "Secrets and Lies", Ray Baker guest-starred as rogue CIA Agent Bruno Hawks. In the season finale "The Fisher King (Part I)", Charles Haid guest-starred as one of the series most notorious criminals, Randall Garner, aka "The Fisher King", a serial killer and abductor responsible for the attempted murder of Elle Greenaway. The incident proved to be so traumatizing, she resigned from the BAU the following season.

Episodes

Home media

References

External links

Criminal Minds
2005 American television seasons
2006 American television seasons